Brigadier Joan Olivia Elsie Moriarty,  (11 May 1923 – 19 July 2020) was a British military nurse and nursing administrator who served as Matron-in-Chief/Director of the Queen Alexandra's Royal Army Nursing Corps from 1977 to 1981. She was decorated with the Royal Red Cross in the 1977 New Year Honours, and made a Companion of the Order of the Bath in the 1979 Birthday Honours.

She died on 19 July 2020 at the age of 97.

References

1923 births
2020 deaths
Companions of the Order of the Bath
Members of the Royal Red Cross
Queen Alexandra's Royal Army Nursing Corps officers
British Army brigadiers